Föhrenwald was one of the largest displaced persons camps in post-World War II Europe and the last to close, in 1957.  It was located in the section now known as Waldram in Wolfratshausen in Bavaria, Germany.

The camp facilities were originally built in 1939 by IG Farben as housing for its employees at the several munitions factories that it operated in the vicinity. During the war it was used to house slave laborers.  In June 1945, the camp was appropriated by the US Army administration of postwar Germany's American sector, for the purpose of housing international refugees. The camp's initial population comprised refugees of Jewish, Yugoslavian, Hungarian, and Baltic origin.  On 3 October 1945 General Dwight D. Eisenhower ordered that Föhrenwald be made an exclusively Jewish DP camp, after he had found living conditions at the Feldafing DP camp unacceptable.

From 1946 to 1948, Föhrenwald grew to become the third largest DP camp in the American sector, after Feldafing and Landsberg.  By January 1946, its population had reached 5,600.  Many couples got married there. The birth rate in 1946 stood at 70-80 births per thousand, about double that of countries in the developing world.

As part of the network of Displaced Persons camps, Föhrenwald operated under the auspices of UNRRA. The camp's director, Henry Cohen, was a young US army veteran who went to great lengths to provide for the residents' welfare. Assisting Cohen in the camp's administration and operation was a Camp Committee whose members were elected from among candidates representing a range of political parties.

As director, Cohen fostered the rehabilitation of the camp's residents, encouraging adult education and vocational training. A school was established for youngsters, with extracurricular activities arranged largely through the efforts of local chapters of the Jewish youth movements. The camp's autonomous cultural life included musical and theatrical performances. It published an internal newspaper, Bamidbar ("In the wilderness", the Hebrew name for the Book of Numbers), that in 1947 issued a 100-page almanac documenting the camp's activities.

Residents enjoyed freedom to practice their religion. A yeshiva (rabbinic seminary and Torah academy) was established within the camp. With the presence of Rabbi Yekusiel Yehudah Halberstam, founder of the Klausenberg Hasidic dynasty, and his followers, Föhrenwald became the center for Hasidic Jewry in the American sector.

Streets in Föhrenwald were typically named for American states and individuals, but these have been renamed. For example, Rooseveltstrasse is now Thomasstrasse; Pennsylvianastrasse has become Faulhaberstrasse, etc.

During the early years of the camp's operation, residents mounted several protest campaigns against Allied policy, particularly regarding the restrictions on Jewish immigration to Mandatory Palestine. The Zionist youth movements organized communal groups called kibbutzim for training young pioneers. A number of residents who attempted clandestine immigration to Mandatory Palestine in violation of British restrictions, were apprehended by the authorities and sent back to Föhrenwald.

A tuberculosis epidemic swept the camp in the summer of 1946, prompted the establishment of a "Committee of Jewish Tubercular Patients". The committee became an advocate for those residents who were unwilling or unable to leave.

In 1951, the West German government took over administration of the camp, while the American Jewish Joint Distribution Committee maintained a presence there until 1954.  By that time, the remaining residents of other camps that were closed were transferred to Föhrenwald which continued in operation until 1956.

In 1956, the Katholisches Siedlungswerk, a Catholic housing institution, took over the site, which then became the home of German families arriving from Eastern Europe. The last Jewish resident left on 28 February 1957. The site was renamed Waldram on 7 November 1957. Today, it is residential area of the city of Wolfratshausen.

Museum 
An museum and information centre in the building of the previous mikvah was opened in 2018. The Erinnerungsort Badehaus tells the story of Föhrenwald from its foundation until today.

See also
 Sh'erit ha-Pletah

References

External links
  US Holocaust Memorial Museum article on Foehrenwald
  Text of talk (1996) by Henry Cohen, former director of the Föhrenwald DP camp, based on his detailed reports written during his tenure
 

Displaced persons camps in the aftermath of World War II
IG Farben
Residential buildings completed in 1939
Buildings and structures in Bad Tölz-Wolfratshausen
Aftermath of the Holocaust